Rock Crawler may refer to:

 Grylloblattidae, rock-crawling insects
 Rock crawling, a motor sport